"Bizarre Love Triangle" is a song by English rock band New Order, released as a single in November 1986 from their fourth studio album, Brotherhood (1986), which reached the top five on the US Hot Dance Music/Club Play Singles chart, and  5 on the Australian ARIA Charts (No. 1 on the Victoria state chart) in March 1987.

It failed to make the top 40 in either the United Kingdom (only reaching No. 56) or the US Billboard Hot 100. In the United States, the song reached No. 8 on the Hot Dance Music/Maxi-Singles Sales chart, but failed to chart on the Hot 100 during its original 1986 release. However, a new mix included on The Best of New Order was released in 1994 and finally made a brief appearance on the Billboard Hot 100 in the No. 98 position in 1995. In 2004, the song was ranked No. 204 on Rolling Stones "The 500 Greatest Songs of All Time."

Releases
The 12-inch version, remixed by Shep Pettibone, also appears on the compilation Substance and a second remix by Stephen Hague features on their Best Of album. The original album version appears on the 2005 compilation Singles, the 7-inch version appears on the 2016 reissue of this compilation. New Order's live versions since 1998 are based on the Shep Pettibone remix.

The single mix features more electronics than the album version, with the Fairlight CMI music workstation used to provide sounds such as the orchestral hits, and to sequence the song. All instruments except vocals and Peter Hook's melodic bass were sequenced (the song also prominently features synthesised bass and synth choir parts).

Music video
The music video, which was released in November 1986, was directed by American artists Robert Longo and Gretchen Bender. It prominently featured shots of a man and a woman in business suits flying through the air as though propelled by trampolines; this is based directly on Longo's "Men in the Cities" series of lithographs. The video has a black and white cut-scene where Jodi Long and E. Max Frye are arguing about reincarnation, in which Long emphatically declares "I don't believe in reincarnation because I refuse to come back as a bug or as a rabbit!" Frye responds, "You know, you're a real 'up' person," before the song resumes. It also features clips that Gretchen would later use for her next project "Total Recall".

Reception
"Bizarre Love Triangle" has been critically acclaimed since its release.  In a 30th anniversary retrospective citing the song as one of the greatest of all time, Billboard described it as a "synth-pop masterpiece" and "an incandescent jewel of mid-'80s computer love."  NME praised the song as New Order's "finest pop moment" and credited its simplicity in comparison to previous singles such as "Blue Monday".  In 2004, the song was ranked No. 204 in Rolling Stones list of "The 500 Greatest Songs of All Time." In 2013, Stereogum ranked the song No. 2 on their list of the 10 greatest New Order songs, and in 2021, The Guardian ranked the song No. 7 on their list of the 30 greatest New Order songs.

Track listings

 Initial pressings (matrix FAC-26-A) were the UK 7-inch mix; later pressings (matrix FAC-26-A2) were the Canadian 7-inch mix

 US editions mis-credit "Bizarre Dub Triangle" as "I Don't Care", reputedly due to a record company person contacting New Order's Manager Rob Gretton to ask what to name the mix as, Gretton is claimed to have said "I don't care"

Personnel
 Bernard Sumner – lead and backing vocals, synthesizers and programming
 Peter Hook – bass, electronic percussion, programming
 Stephen Morris – drums, synthesizers and programming
 Gillian Gilbert – synthesizers and programming

Charts

Weekly charts

Year-end charts

Cover versions and remixes
 Australian band Frente! released an acoustic cover version of the song in 1994, re-imagining it as a folk ballad. Issued as part of the Lonely EP in their home country, the cover peaked at No. 7 on the ARIA Singles Chart and became a hit overseas, reaching No. 49 on the US Billboard Hot 100, No. 53 in Canada, and No. 76 in the United Kingdom. In Australia it came in at No. 63 on the 1994 year-end chart and was certified gold for shipments of over 35,000.
 The song was also remixed in 2005 by the Crystal Method (for their album Community Service II) and by Richard X (for the New Order single "Waiting for the Sirens' Call").

References

1986 singles
1986 songs
1994 singles
Factory Records singles
New Order (band) songs
Qwest Records singles
Songs written by Bernard Sumner
Songs written by Peter Hook
Songs written by Stephen Morris (musician)
Songs written by Gillian Gilbert